The 2013 Direct Horizontal Drilling Fall Classic was held from October 11 to 14 at the Crestwood Curling Club in Edmonton, Alberta as part of the 2013–14 World Curling Tour. The event was held in a triple-knockout format, and the purse for the event was CAD$50,000, of which the winner, Kevin Martin, received CAD$13,000. Martin defeated Brock Virtue of Saskatchewan with a score of 6–5 in an extra end.

Teams
The teams are listed as follows:

Knockout results
The draw is listed as follows:

A event

B event

C event

Playoffs

References

External links

2013 in Canadian curling
Sport in Edmonton